The JCPenney Classic was a mixed team golf tournament sponsored by the PGA Tour and the LPGA Tour. Teams consisted of one PGA Tour player and one LPGA Tour player (except in 1967 when the teams were male only). It was played in California and Florida. Corporate sponsors were Haig & Haig, Pepsi-Cola, and JCPenney.

Tournament hosts

Winners
JCPenney Classic
1999 John Daly and Laura Davies
1998 Steve Pate and Meg Mallon
1997 Clarence Rose and Amy Fruhwirth
1996 Mike Hulbert and Donna Andrews
1995 Davis Love III and Beth Daniel
1994 Brad Bryant and Marta Figueras-Dotti
1993 Mike Springer and Melissa McNamara
1992 Dan Forsman and Dottie Mochrie
1991 Billy Andrade and Kris Tschetter
1990 Davis Love III and Beth Daniel
1989 Bill Glasson and Pat Bradley
1988 John Huston and Amy Benz
1987 Steve Jones and Jane Crafter
1986 Tom Purtzer and Juli Inkster
1985 Larry Rinker and Laurie Rinker

JCPenney Mixed Team Classic
1984 Mike Donald and Vicki Alvarez
1983 Fred Couples and Jan Stephenson
1982 John Mahaffey and JoAnne Carner
1981 Tom Kite and Beth Daniel
1980 Curtis Strange and Nancy Lopez
1979 Dave Eichelberger and Murle Breer
1978 Lon Hinkle and Pat Bradley

Pepsi-Cola Mixed Team Championship
1977 Jerry Pate and Hollis Stacy
1976 Chi-Chi Rodríguez and Jo Ann Washam
1968–75 No tournament

Haig & Haig Scotch Foursome
1967 Laurie Hammer and Dave Stockton (all male teams)
1966 Jack Rule, Jr. and Sandra Spuzich
1965 Gardner Dickinson and Ruth Jessen
1964 Sam Snead and Shirley Englehorn
1963 Dave Ragan and Mickey Wright
1962 Mason Rudolph and Kathy Whitworth
1961 Dave Ragan and Mickey Wright
1960 Jim Turnesa and Gloria Armstrong

PGA Tour unofficial money events
Former LPGA Tour events
Golf in California
Golf in Florida
Carlsbad, California
Mixed sports competitions
Women's sports in Florida
Women's sports in California
Sports competitions in San Diego County, California